Men Go To Battle is a 2015 American dark comedy/drama film directed by Zachary Treitz and written by Treitz and Kate Lyn Sheil. It stars Tim Morton, David Maloney, Rachel Korine, Sheil, and Steve Coulter.  The film had its world premiere at the Tribeca Film Festival on April 17, 2015. This was Rachel Korine's last film role before her retirement from acting in 2015.

Synopsis
In 1861, two brothers Francis and Henry Mellon (played by Tim Morton and David Maloney) try to grow crops on their inhospitable patch of land in Kentucky. The brothers play pranks on one another. Francis makes questionable decisions about money and managing the farm. As tensions run high, the two get into a fight that leads Henry to join the Northern side during the American Civil War leaving Francis behind to manage the farm.

Cast
Tim Morton as Henry Mellon
David Maloney as Francis Mellon
Rachel Korine as Betsy Small
Kate Lyn Sheil as Josephine Small 
Steve Coulter as Mr. Small
Charlotte Arnold as Sissy Hamblin
Turner Ross as Valentine Atkin

Release
The film had its world premiere at the Tribeca Film Festival on April 17, 2015. Shortly after, it was announced that Film Movement had acquired U.S distribution rights to the film.

Reception
Men Go To Battle received overall positive reviews from critics and has a “Fresh” score of 69% on Rotten Tomatoes based on 26 reviews.

References

External links

Film Movement official site

2015 films
2015 comedy-drama films
American comedy-drama films
American independent films
Films set in Kentucky
Films shot in Kentucky
2015 comedy films
2015 independent films
2010s English-language films
2010s American films